Porschdorf is a railway station in the village of Porschdorf in the municipality of Bad Schandau, Saxony, Germany. 
The station is served by one train service, operated by DB Regio in cooperation with České dráhy: the National Park Railway. This service connects Děčín and Rumburk via Bad Schandau and Sebnitz.

References

External links
Network map
Porschdorf station at the Deutsche Bahn website
Städtebahn Sachsen website

Railway stations in Saxony
Bad Schandau